Wangniudun is a town under the direct administration of Dongguan City in the Pearl River Delta, Guangdong province. The G4 Beijing–Hong Kong and Macau Expressway, China National Highway 107, Dongguan Ring Road pass through or near the town.

References

External links

Geography of Dongguan
Towns in Guangdong